Roman Kozlov (born November 13, 1989) is a Ukrainian professional basketball player for Kharkivski Sokoly in the Ukrainian Basketball Superleague.

Early life
Kozlov was born in Kharkiv, Ukraine.

Club career
In August 2019, Kozlov signed with Kharkivski Sokoly of the Ukrainian Basketball Superleague. He averaged 8.2 points and 1.1 assists per game. On October 8, 2020, Kozlov signed with BC Budivelnyk. On February 16, 2022, Kozlov returned to Kharkivski Sokoly.

References

1989 births
Living people
Shooting guards
Ukrainian men's basketball players
BC Kharkivski Sokoly players
BC Politekhnik players